Michael Jonathan Pitre (born January 3, 1985) is an American football coach and former player who is the running backs coach for the Atlanta Falcons of the National Football League (NFL). Pitre was previously the running backs coach for the Chicago Bears.

College career
After graduating from El Modena High School, Pitre chose to attend UCLA. While at UCLA, Pitre played fullback, where he was a three-year starter and a team captain.

Coaching career
After graduating from UCLA, Pitre coached at the high school level, becoming a coach for Rancho Santa Margarita and Servite  High School. After four years at the high school level, Pitre became an assistant coach for Colorado. Pitre would later become a running backs coach at the collegiate level, being hired for the position at Montana State. After four years at Montana State, Pitre became the running backs coach at a higher level, becoming the running backs coach for Oregon State. Following three years at Oregon State, Pitre would become a running backs coach for the Chicago Bears. After one year with the Bears, Pitre became the running backs coach for the Atlanta Falcons.

References

Living people
1985 births
Coaches of American football from California
Atlanta Falcons coaches
Chicago Bears coaches
Oregon State Beavers football coaches
Montana State Bobcats football coaches
Colorado Buffaloes football coaches